Olive Beaupré Miller (née Olive Kennon Beaupré) (September 11, 1883 – March 25, 1968) was an American writer, publisher and editor of children's literature. She was born in Aurora, Illinois on September 11, 1883, to William S. and Julia (Brady) Beaupré. She received her B.A. from Smith College in 1904.

The Book House for Children

In 1919 Miller established a company, The Book House for Children, to publish  popular children’s literature edited by herself to meet her standards:

"First,--To be well equipped for life, to have ideas and the ability to express them, the child needs a broad background of familiarity with the best in literature.
"Second,--His stories and rhymes must be selected with care that he may absorb no distorted view of life and its actual values, but may grow up to be mentally clear about values and emotionally impelled to seek what is truly desirable and worthwhile in human living.
"Third,--The stories and rhymes selected must be graded to the child's understanding at different periods of his growth, graded as to vocabulary, as to subject matter and as to complexity of structure and plot." 

The first volume of The Book House series was published in 1920. The series would eventually include twelve volumes. 

Later versions of The Book House contained some short stories (such as Little Black Sambo and The Tar Baby) which were thought to be insensitive, and were removed from the Beaupré canon. But as late as 1950 (33rd printing), “Sambo” was still included.

The company was also remarkable for its large female staff at a time when most women did not work outside the home.

Illustrators for The Book House series included Maude and Miska Petersham, Donn Philip Crane, Hilda Hanway, Milo Winter, and Peter Newell.

Other series published by the company, The Book House for Children, included "My Travelship" and "A Picturesque Tale of Progress." The Book House for Children was sold to United Educators in 1954.

Bibliography 
My Book House (6 volumes)
 Volume 1, In the Nursery (1920)
 Volume 2, Up One Pair of Stairs (1920)
 Volume 3, Through Fairy Halls (1920)
 Volume 4, The Treasure Chest (1920)
 Volume 5, From The Tower Window (1921)
 Volume 6, The Latch Key (1921)
My Travelship (3 volumes)
 Little Pictures of Japan (1925)
 Tales Told in Holland (1926)
 Nursery Friends From France (1927)
My Book House (7 volumes – red series)
 Volume 1, In the Nursery (1925)
 Volume 2, Story Time (1925)
 Volume 3, Up One Pair of Stairs (1925)
 Volume 4, Over the Hills (1925)
 Volume 5, Through Fairy Halls (1925)
 Volume 6, The Magic Garden (1925)
 Volume 7, The Latch Key with Index (1925)
A Picturesque Tale of Progress (1929)
 Beginnings 1 and 2
 Conquests 1 and 2
 New Nations 1 and 2
 Explorations 1 and 2
My Book House (12 volumes – 1932, 1937, 1971)
Each of the original thicker volumes were divided and made more picture-book-like and easier for a child to handle. The style of illustration and text were changed as well from the original 1920s edition.
 Volume 1, In the Nursery 
 Volume 2, Story Time 
 Volume 3, Up One Pair of Stairs 
 Volume 4, Through the Gate 
 Volume 5, Over The Hills 
 Volume 6, Through Fairy Halls 
 Volume 7, The Magic Garden 
 Volume 8, Flying Sails 
 Volume 9, The Treasure Chest 
 Volume 10, From the Tower Window 
 Volume 11, In Shining Armor 
 Volume 12, Halls of Fame

Other publishers
 Engines and Brass Bands"Waubonsie Tales (Chicago: Book House, NY: Doubleday, Doran, 1933), 
 Heroes, Outlaws and Funny Fellows of American Popular Tales, by Miller, illustrated by Richard Bennett (Doubleday, Doran, 1939),  
 Heroes of the Bible, by Miller, illus. Mariel Wilhoite (NY: Standard Book, 1940), ; later

References

External links

Olive Beaupré Miller papers at the Sophia Smith Collection, Smith College Special Collections
Olive Beaupre Miller at the Winnetka Historical Society
My Book House cover illustrations from Childscapes.com
 

1883 births
1968 deaths
American book editors
American book publishers (people)
American women writers
Smith College alumni
People from Aurora, Illinois